Zoltán Tóth (born 24 August 1979) is a Hungarian former competitive figure skater. He is a five-time Hungarian national champion and competed in two Winter Olympics.

Personal life 
Zoltán Tóth was born on 24 August 1979 in Debrecen, Hungary.

Career 
Tóth began skating in 1988. Early in his career, he was coached by András Száraz. Zsófia Kulcsár became his coach in 1998.

Tóth became Hungary's senior national champion for the first time in the 2000–01 season. He represented Vasas Skating Club in Budapest. The following season, he competed at the 2002 Winter Olympics in Salt Lake City, Utah, placing 25th. His highest ISU Championship placement, 17th, came at the 2003 Europeans in Malmö, Sweden.

In the 2003–04 season, Tóth began representing Jegcsillag Skating Club in Budapest. He won silver medals at the 2003 Golden Spin of Zagreb and 2003 Crystal Skate of Romania. He placed 25th at both the 2004 European Championships in Budapest and 2004 World Championships in Dortmund.

Tóth started the 2005–06 season with a sixth-place result at the 2005 Ondrej Nepela Memorial in Bratislava, Slovakia. In October, he competed at the 2005 Karl Schäfer Memorial in Vienna – the final opportunity to qualify for the Olympics – and finished 7th, which would turn out to be sufficient. In February 2006, he competed at the Winter Olympics in Turin, Italy. He was one of 24 skaters to qualify for the free skate, having ranked 24th in the short, and finished 24th overall. It was his final competitive appearance.

Tóth is a coach at Jégvirág Miskolc Skating Club in Miskolc, Hungary.

Programs

Results
JGP: Junior Series/Junior Grand Prix

References

External links
 

1979 births
Living people
Hungarian male single skaters
Olympic figure skaters of Hungary
Figure skaters at the 2002 Winter Olympics
Figure skaters at the 2006 Winter Olympics
Sportspeople from Debrecen